Xu Zhonglin (1567 - c. 1619 or 1620) was a Chinese writer who lived in the Ming dynasty. He is best known as the author of the 16th century semi-mythical novel Investiture of the Gods. He was born in Yingtian Prefecture, present-day Nanjing.

An original copy of Investiture of the Gods is held in the Japanese Library of the Grand Secretariat, printed by Shu Zaiyang. The second section of the book is inscribed with the words "edited by Xu Zhonglin, the Old Recluse of Mount Zhong." This is likely the source of his possible pseudonym "Zhongshan Yisou", which literally means "a carefree old man living in Mount Zhong". Some say that Xu wrote the novel for a trousseau for his daughter.

See also
 Chinese literature

References 

Ming dynasty novelists
Investiture of the Gods
Chinese fantasy writers
Writers from Nanjing
Chinese male novelists

1567 births